A double degree program, sometimes called a dual degree, combined degree, conjoint degree, joint degree or double graduation program, involves a student working for two university degrees at the same time  —either at the same institution or at different institutions, sometimes in different countries. The two degrees might be in the same subject area, or in two different subjects.

Examples

Undergraduate
Brunei – Sultan Sharif Ali Islamic University 
Provide a double degree for Bachelor of Laws (LL.B) and Bachelor of Sharia Law (BSL)

France – Canada: Dual bachelor's degree between Sciences Po and the University of British Columbia
For the first two years of their undergraduate studies students attend one of Sciences Po's three regional campuses. Their final two years of study can be matriculated at the Faculty of Arts (Bachelor of Arts option) or the Sauder School of Business (Bachelor of Commerce option). Double degree leading to a Bachelor of Arts from Sciences Po and either a second Bachelor of Arts or a Bachelor of Commerce from the University of British Columbia.

 Indonesia – Universitas Indonesia & University of Newcastle upon Tyne
Universitas Indonesia is among the first universities in Indonesia to offer a double degree program. This was early introduced into their Faculty of Medicine through the 3+1 scheme.  Students will receive a degree from Universitas Indonesia (for the Bachelor of Medicine) and another from University of Newcastle upon Tyne (for the Master of Research) together with the Medical Doctor (M.D.) earned during the professional phase held subsequently after completing their times abroad. Considered as a fast track initiative, students get to pursue both their undergraduate bachelors and postgraduate masters in just a period of four years time. Less research-inclined students are given an option to continue their studies in Australia, with the University of Melbourne and Monash University both awarding the Bachelor of Medical Science (BMedSc). Established since 1999, this medical program is only available through UI's International Classes with medium of Instruction held in English. 

Mexico – Autonomous University of Nuevo León & Japan – Nagaoka University of Technology
Undergraduate alumni of Mexican Institution enrolled in Civil Engineering are abled to obtain their respective Japanese degree attending the final two years of study to the respective Japanese university.

Netherlands – University of Amsterdam
Provide double bachelor programs (DuBa) for certain Bachelor of Sciences (Bsc.), leading up to two separate bachelor's degrees. These include a double bachelor for Mathematics and either Physics or Computer Science, and a double bachelor for Medicine and Biomedical Sciences

Graduate
 France – ParisTech
Many double degree programs exist in France especially with the collegiate universities such as ParisTech. One of its most famous program is the double degree in engineering and management delivered by the École Polytechnique and HEC Paris.

Netherlands – University of Groningen & United Kingdom – Newcastle University
Students have the opportunity to study at Newcastle University and the University of Groningen. On successful completion of the course, students receive two MSc degrees with the following awards:
Operations and Supply Chain Management MSc from Newcastle University 
Technology Operations Management MSc from the University of Groningen

United States – University of Houston
Provides numerous double degrees, including double degrees for Juris Doctor and Master of Business Administration, and double degree for Master of Social Work and Master of Public Policy.

See also
 Academic major
 Double majors in the United States
 Interdisciplinarity

References 

 

Academic degrees